Anatol Dumitraș (November 14, 1955 – June 14, 2016) was a Moldovan singer.

Discography 
 Sus paharul (2000)
 Ultima seară (2003)
 Azi la masa mare (2005)
 Anii mei, destinul meu (2007)
 Roata vieții (2008)

References 

1955 births
2016 deaths
People from Briceni District
20th-century Moldovan male singers
21st-century Moldovan male singers